Lawrencetown, Nova Scotia may refer to:

 Lawrencetown, Annapolis County, Nova Scotia
 Lawrencetown, Halifax County, Nova Scotia
 East Lawrencetown, Nova Scotia, also in Halifax County
 Upper Lawrencetown, Nova Scotia, also in Halifax County
 West Lawrencetown, Nova Scotia, also in Halifax County